Balad District is a district of the Saladin Governorate, Iraq. The district capital is the city of Balad.

Balad District
Balad District consists of several towns:
Balad
Al Dhuluiya
Al Ishaqi
Yathrib
Aziz Balad
Al Rowashid
Tel Al Thahab
Al Owaisat

Districts of Saladin Governorate